Vaccinium macrocarpon (also called large cranberry, American cranberry and bearberry) is a North American species of cranberry of the subgenus Oxycoccus and genus Vaccinium.

The name cranberry, comes from shape of the flower stamen, which looks like a crane's beak.

Description 
Vaccinium macrocarpon is a perennial shrub, often ascending (trailing along the surface of the ground for some distance but then curving upwards).

Distribution 
Vaccinium macrocarpon is native to central and eastern Canada (Ontario to Newfoundland) and the northeastern and north-central United States (Northeast, Great Lakes Region, and Appalachians as far south as North Carolina and Tennessee). It is also naturalized in parts of Europe and scattered locations in North America along western Canada (British Columbia) and the western United States (West Coast).

Human uses 
The species is grown commercially as a cash crop for its edible berries. Many of these are grown in artificial ponds called cranberry bogs. A common use of the berries is in sauce to be served with roast turkey. There is some evidence suggesting that the berries or their juice could be useful in treating or preventing certain urinary tract infections, but this is not certain yet and thus is not a substitute for medical management. Some research suggests cranberries may suppress asymptomatic Helicobacter pylori colonization, but they seem to be an inferior treatment compared to antibiotic therapy in symptomatic patients.

See also 

 Cranberry fruit rot, which affects V. macrocarpon

References

External links 

 Lady Bird Johnson Wildflower Center, University of Texas
 

Flora of Eastern Canada
macrocarpon
Crops originating from North America
Aquatic plants
Plants described in 1789
Fruits originating in North America
Flora of the Northeastern United States
Flora of the Southeastern United States
Flora of the North-Central United States
Flora of Oregon
Flora of Washington (state)
Flora of British Columbia
macrocarpon
Flora without expected TNC conservation status